Edward Leo "Shea" Farrell III is an American actor and producer best known for playing Mark Danning in Aaron Spelling's series, Hotel.

Shea Farrell was born October 21, 1957 in Cornwall, New York, to Edward Leo, Jr. and Mary Rose (née Drummey) Farrell. He attended Portsmouth Abbey School in Portsmouth, Rhode Island. He originally planned to be a professional football player.

Shea switched from acting to production work in 1997. He worked on The Practice, Ally McBeal, Boston Public and Boston Legal, all produced by David E. Kelley. He now works in films and on television as an assistant director and unit production manager. He has been a Unit Production Manager Sony Entertainment's New Media Division/Crackle.com since 2008.

Filmography

As actor
 1982: Capitol (Television series): Matt McCandless No. 1 (1982) (original cast)
 1983: Hotel (TV): Mark Danning
 1987: The Law and Harry McGraw (TV series): Steve Lacey (1987–1988)
 1989: Major League: Tolbert
 1990: Back to Hannibal: The Return of Tom Sawyer and Huckleberry Finn (TV): Lyle Newman
 1993: The Untouchables (TV series): Agent Sean Quinlan (1994)
 1995: While You Were Sleeping: Ashley's Husband
 1995: Mord ist ihr (Staffel 12, Episode 11)
 1996: Deadly Charades: Guy Sharp
 1996: Same River Twice: Stan
 1996: Mr. Wrong: James
 1998: Tycus (video game): Lt. Garrison
 1999: Valerie Flake: Thrusting Guy
 2006: Where There's a Will (TV): Older Doctor

As producer
 1998: Ally McBeal
 2009: Phil Cobb's Dinner for Four (post-production)

References

External links
 

1957 births
Living people
People from Cornwall, New York
Male actors from New York (state)
Film producers from New York (state)
People from Portsmouth, Rhode Island
Portsmouth Abbey School alumni